Brandon Curry (born October 19, 1982) is an American professional bodybuilder who competes in the men's open bodybuilding division in the IFBB pro league. He is the 2019 Mr. Olympia bodybuilding champion.

Biography

Early life
Curry was born and raised in Nashville, Tennessee. He first became interested in weight training when he received a pair of Hulk Hogan-branded dumbbells for his sixth birthday. Curry would later recall in a magazine interview that he was motivated by superhero action figure G.I. Joe and the Rocky and Rambo films to develop his body to its fullest muscular capacity.

As a child, Curry's parents enrolled him in gymnastics classes, but he lost interest in the sport.  Curry was involved in wrestling, track and field and football while he was a student at Hunters Lane Comprehensive High School in Nashville.

Curry attended Middle Tennessee State University in Murfreesboro, Tennessee, where he majored in exercise science. He initially played on the university's football team, but later left the team and switched his athletic focus to bodybuilding-related weight training. 
Outside of bodybuilding, Curry works as a personal trainer. He divides his residency between Nashville and Oceanside, California.

Bodybuilding career

Initially competing in the light-heavyweight class, Curry won his first bodybuilding competition, the 2003 Supernatural Bodybuilding. On June 17, 2006, he came in second in the light-heavyweight division at the NPC Junior National Championships; the five-foot-seven Curry weighed 189 pounds for that event. The following year, with 28 additional pounds added to his frame, he moved up to the heavyweight division for the NPC USA Championships on July 28, 2007, where he finished second in his division.  On November 17, 2007, he came in second in the heavyweight division for that year's NPC National Championships.

In 2019, he won the Arnold Classic and cemented himself as one of the elite bodybuilders in the world with his win at the 2019 Mr. Olympia. His initial success was in 2011 Mr. Olympia competitions where he stood 8th on his first time coming to Olympia's Stage. On July 25, 2008, Curry won both the heavyweight division and the overall of the NPC USA Championships, which secured him ranking as a professional bodybuilder.

Professional contest history
2003 Supernatural Bodybuilding,  1st
2006 NPC Junior National Championships,  2nd
2007 NPC USA Championships,  2nd
2008 NPC USA Championships,  1st
2010 Europa Super Show,  8th
2010 Pro Bodybuilding Weekly Championship,  6th
2011 IFBB Mr.Olympia,  8th
2012 IFBB Arnold Classic, 7th
2013 IFBB Arnold Classic Brasil, 1st
2015 IFBB Arnold Classic, 7th
2017 IFBB New Zealand Pro, 1st
2017 IFBB Arnold Classic Aus, 1st
2017 IFBB Mr. Olympia, 8th
2017 IFBB Ferrigno Legacy, 1st
2018 IFBB Mr. Olympia, 5th
2019 IFBB Arnold Classic, 1st
2019 IFBB Mr. Olympia, 1st
2020 IFBB Mr. Olympia, 2nd
2021 IFBB Mr. Olympia, 2nd
2022 IFBB Arnold classic, 1st
2022 IFBB Mr. Olympia, 4th

Personal life 
Curry is married to his long-time girlfriend, Brandy Leaver. The couple has one daughter, named Zoey Curry, and three sons, including Marvelous Curry.

References

External links
Brandon Curry’s MySpace page 
Brandon Curry wins 2013 Arnold Classic Brasil

1982 births
People from Nashville, Tennessee
Sportspeople from Oceanside, California
Middle Tennessee Blue Raiders football players
African-American bodybuilders
American bodybuilders
Professional bodybuilders
Living people
21st-century African-American sportspeople
20th-century African-American people